The Prix Lupin was a Group 1 flat horse race in France open to three-year-old thoroughbred colts and fillies. It was run at Longchamp over a distance of 2,100 metres (about 1 mile and 2½ furlongs), and it was scheduled to take place each year in May.

History

The event was established in 1855, and it was originally called the Prix de l'Empereur. It was initially held at the Champ de Mars, and was transferred to Longchamp in 1857. It was cancelled due to the Franco-Prussian War in 1871, and was renamed the Grande Poule des Produits in 1872.

The race was one of several trials for the Prix du Jockey Club collectively known as the Poules des Produits. The others (listed by their modern titles) were the Prix Daru, the Prix Hocquart, the Prix Noailles and the Prix Greffulhe. Unlike those races, the Grande Poule des Produits had no restrictions based on the nationality of a horse's sire or dam.

The event was renamed in memory of Auguste Lupin (1807–1895), a successful owner-breeder, in 1896.

The Prix Lupin was abandoned throughout World War I, with no running from 1915 to 1918. It was cancelled once during World War II, in 1940. It was run at Le Tremblay over 2,150 metres in 1943, and at Maisons-Laffitte in 1944.

The present system of race grading was introduced in 1971, and the Prix Lupin was classed at Group 1 level.

The race was last run in 2004. It was discontinued after France Galop restructured its Group 1 programme for three-year-olds in 2005.

Records
Leading jockey (7 wins):
 George Stern – Saxon (1901), Ajax (1904), Genial (1905), Floraison (1912), Insensible (1919), Ksar (1921), Irismond (1924)

Leading trainer (7 wins):
 Tom Jennings – Mademoiselle de Chantilly (1857), Union Jack (1859), Le Mandarin (1865), Trocadero (1867), Braconnier (1876), Clementine (1878), Leon (1881)

Leading owner (7 wins):
 Frédéric de Lagrange – Mademoiselle de Chantilly (1857), Union Jack (1859), Le Mandarin (1865), Trocadero (1867), Braconnier (1876), Clementine (1878), Leon (1881)
 Edmond Blanc – Soukaras (1883), Gouverneur (1891), Gouvernail (1894), Saxon (1901), Caius (1903), Ajax (1904), Genial (1905)
 Édouard de Rothschild – Sans Souci (1907), Floraison (1912), Le Farina (1914), Bubbles (1928), Brantôme (1934), Aromate (1935), Bacchus (1939)
 Marcel Boussac – Irismond (1924), Tourbillon (1931), Ardan (1944), Djelal (1947), Ambiorix (1949), Dankaro (1974), Acamas (1978)

Winners since 1960

Earlier winners

 1855: Baroncino
 1856: Isolier
 1857: Mademoiselle de Chantilly
 1858: Gouvieux
 1859: Union Jack
 1860: Beauvais
 1861: Finlande
 1862: Choisy le Roi
 1863: Dollar
 1864: Bois Roussel
 1865: Le Mandarin
 1866:
 1867: Trocadero
 1868: Suzerain
 1869: Cerdagne
 1870: Sornette
 1871: no race
 1872: Little Agnes
 1873: Franc Tireur
 1874: Sabre
 1875: Almanza
 1876: Braconnier
 1877: Jongleur
 1878: Clementine
 1879: Salteador
 1880: Beauminet
 1881: Leon
 1882: Vigilant
 1883: Soukaras
 1884: Archiduc
 1885: Xaintrailles
 1886: Jupin
 1887: Tenebreuse
 1888: Stuart
 1889: Cleodore
 1890: Puchero
 1891: Gouverneur
 1892: Chene Royal
 1893: Callistrate
 1894: Gouvernail
 1895: Le Sagittaire
 1896: Champignol
 1897: Palmiste
 1898: Gardefeu
 1899: Holocauste
 1900: Ivry
 1901: Saxon
 1902: Kizil Kourgan
 1903: Caius
 1904: Ajax
 1905: Genial
 1906: Maintenon
 1907: Sans Souci
 1908: Holbein
 1909: Oversight
 1910: Coquille
 1911: Alcantara
 1912: Floraison
 1913: Ecouen
 1914: La Farina
 1915–18: no race
 1919: Insensible
 1920: Battersea
 1921: Ksar
 1922: Joyeux Drille
 1923: Massine
 1924: Irismond
 1925: Aquatinte
 1926: Biribi
 1927: Mon Talisman
 1928: Bubbles
 1929: Hotweed
 1930: Xandover
 1931: Tourbillon
 1932: Shred
 1933: Cappiello
 1934: Brantôme
 1935: Aromate
 1936: Mieuxce
 1937: Clairvoyant
 1938: Castel Fusano
 1939: Bacchus
 1940: no race
 1941: Le Pacha
 1942: Tornado
 1943: Pensbury
 1944: Ardan
 1945: Mistral
 1946: Prince Chevalier
 1947: Djelal
 1948: Rigolo
 1949: Ambiorix
 1950: Tantieme
 1951: Mat de Cocagne
 1952: Vamos
 1953: Dandy Drake
 1954: Sica Boy
 1955: Nistralin
 1956: Tanerko
 1957: Al Mabsoot
 1958: Alegrador
 1959: Midnight Sun
</div>

See also
 List of French flat horse races
 Recurring sporting events established in 1855 – this race is included under its original title, Prix de l'Empereur.

References
 France Galop / Racing Post:
 galop.courses-france.com:
 1855–1859, 1860–1889, 1890–1919, 1920–1949, 1950–1979, 1980–2004
 galopp-sieger.de – Prix Lupin (ex Prix de l'Empereur / Grande Poule des Produits).
 horseracingintfed.com – International Federation of Horseracing Authorities – Prix Lupin (2004).
 pedigreequery.com – Prix Lupin – Longchamp.

Horse races in France
Longchamp Racecourse
Flat horse races for three-year-olds
Discontinued horse races
1855 establishments in France
Recurring sporting events established in 1855
2004 disestablishments in France
Recurring sporting events disestablished in 2004